Anny-Charlotte Verney (born 17 May 1943) is a French racing and rally driver. She participated in the 1982 Dakar Rally with Mark Thatcher, son of British prime minister Margaret Thatcher, as her co-driver and navigator. Along with their mechanic Jacky Garnier, they became lost for five days in their Peugeot 504 but were rescued after a military search.

Complete 24 Hours of Le Mans results

References

Living people
French racing drivers
French female racing drivers
24 Hours of Le Mans drivers
World Sportscar Championship drivers
1943 births
Sportspeople from Le Mans
20th-century French women